Bad Route Creek Bridge is a historic bridge which carries County Road 261 across the Bad Route Creek in Dawson County, Montana. The Security Bridge Company built the bridge on behalf of the Montana Highway Department in 1921–22. Neither the bridge company nor the highway department used concrete extensively, and most concrete bridges in the state only had one or two spans; as a result, the bridge is an unusual and well-preserved example of its type. The bridge was part of a route linking Glendive to Terry, which became part of U.S. Route 10 in 1926. US 10 bypassed the bridge when it was rebuilt in 1950.

The bridge was listed on the National Register of Historic Places on April 28, 2011.

References

Road bridges on the National Register of Historic Places in Montana
National Register of Historic Places in Dawson County, Montana
Concrete bridges in the United States
U.S. Route 10
Transportation in Dawson County, Montana
1922 establishments in Montana
Bridges completed in 1922